Hirving Rodrigo Lozano Bahena (born 30 July 1995) is a Mexican professional footballer who plays as a winger for  club Napoli and the Mexico national team. He is popularly known by his nickname Chucky.

Lozano began his career with Pachuca, winning the 2016 Clausura and the 2016–17 CONCACAF Champions League, playing in 152 games and scoring 44 goals for the team. In June 2017, he signed for Dutch side PSV Eindhoven and won the Eredivisie in his first season in the Netherlands, and also finished as the team's top scorer. In 2019, Lozano signed for Napoli for a reported €42 million, making him the most expensive Mexican player of all time.

Participating with various youth teams, Lozano won the 2015 CONCACAF U-20 Championship and played at the 2016 Summer Olympics. He made his senior international debut in February 2016 and represented the nation at the Copa América Centenario, 2017 FIFA Confederations Cup, 2018 FIFA World Cup and 2022 FIFA World Cup.

Club career

Pachuca
Born in Mexico City, 11-year-old Lozano joined the youth academy of C.F. Pachuca in 2006. After starring in the lower leagues, he was called up to the first team by Gabriel Caballero. On 8 February 2014, Lozano made his Liga MX debut against Club América, in which he scored five minutes after his substitution in the 1–0 win at the Estadio Azteca. In his debut tournament with the first team – the Clausura 2014 – Lozano finished runner-up with Pachuca, even scoring the third goal in the 3–2 first leg final win over sibling club Club León. On 30 August, he scored his first brace in the 2–1 victory over León.

On 19 September 2015, Lozano scored an equalizer seven minutes after Dorados de Sinaloa scored first in a league match where Pachuca went on to win 2–1. On 27 February 2016, Lozano scored the first and only goal of the encounter on the first minute of the match against Toluca, with the win placing them first place on the general table. On 19 March, Lozano scored his first hat-trick in Pachuca's 6–0 defeat of Veracruz. Lozano contributed two goals during the semifinal legs of the Clausura championship against León, leading his side to a 3–2 aggregate victory. Pachuca won the league title after they defeated Monterrey 2–1 on aggregate in the finals of the Clausura tournament. He was subsequently included in the tournament's Best XI.

On 16 July 2016, Lozano scored a brace and contributed an assist in the first league match against León, winning 5–1. On 13 September, during the 2016–17 CONCACAF Champions League group stage, he scored four goals in their 11–0 defeat of Police United, helping Pachuca set the record for the biggest win in the history of the competition. He was named CONCACAF Champions League Player of the Week for his performance. Lozano finished the Apertura tournament as the highest-scoring Mexican player with 7 goals, and was again included in the Best XI.

On the opening matchday of the Clausura 2017, on 17 January, he scored a hat-trick against León in Pachuca's 4–2 victory. In April, during the second leg of the CONCACAF Champions League semifinals against FC Dallas, Lozano scored twice within the last 10 minutes of the match to help lead Pachuca to a 3–1 win (4–3 on aggregate) to qualify to the finals. The following month, Pachuca won the CONCACAF Champions League by defeating fellow Mexican club Tigres UANL, with Lozano winning the Golden Boot as the competition's top scorer with 8 goals, as well as the Best Young Player Award.

PSV

2017–18 season
On 19 June 2017, following a lengthy transfer saga which had Lozano linked to a number of European clubs, including Manchester United, Manchester City, Benfica and Ajax, it was announced that Dutch club PSV Eindhoven had secured the signing of Lozano on a six-year contract. He temporarily left the Mexican national side which was in Russia for the Confederations Cup in order to secure the transfer. He became the fifth Mexican player to join PSV.

Lozano made his competitive debut for PSV in the Europa League qualifiers against Croatian side Osijek, playing in both legs as they failed to make the group stage as a result of a 2–0 aggregate score. On 12 August, Lozano scored on his Eredivisie debut with PSV against AZ Alkmaar. He started and played 84 minutes in his team's 3–2 victory, receiving a standing ovation from the home fans as he was subbed off. A week later, he scored once again and provided an assist in PSV's 4–0 win over NAC Breda. The following week, Lozano scored again in PSV's 2–0 victory against Roda JC; he became the first player to score in his first three games with PSV, and he was later named Eredivisie Player of the Month for the month of August. On 10 September 2017, Lozano received his first red card for PSV in a 2–0 defeat against SC Heerenveen.

On 17 February 2018, Lozano received his second red card of the season, again during a league match against Heerenveen, for making contact with defender Lucas Woudenberg's face. He was handed a three-match suspension which was ultimately upheld by the KNVB disciplinary committee after a failed appeal by PSV. Lozano made his return on 18 March, scoring the second goal in PSV's 3–0 victory over VVV Venlo, his 14th goal of the season.

Lozano won the Eredivisie title with PSV following their 3–0 win over rivals Ajax on 15 April. He ended the season as the team's highest scorer in the league with 17 league goals and providing 11 assists.

2018–19 season
Lozano appeared as a second-half substitute in PSV's first match of the 2018–19 season, against Feyenoord in the 2018 Johan Cruyff Shield. With the match tied 0–0 at full time and going into penalties, Lozano successfully converted one but ended on the losing side of a 6–5 loss. On 11 August, Lozano scored in PSV's 2018–19 Eredivisie opener against FC Utrecht, scoring the third goal in their 4–0 victory. He scored again the following week in a 2–1 victory over Fortuna Sittard. Three days later, Lozano made his UEFA Champions League debut against BATE; he scored PSV's second goal in their 3–2 victory in the first-leg of the playoff qualification round.

On 15 September, he would score two goals against ADO in a 7–0 thrashing, with former Pachuca teammate Érick Gutiérrez contributing the assist for the second goal three minutes after being substituted in. Three days later, he made his UEFA Champions League group stage debut against Barcelona, playing all ninety minutes in PSV's 4–0 defeat. His performance led him to be included in the league's best XI for September. Lozano scored another brace on 6 October against VVV, scoring the first and final goal in PSV's 4–0 victory. On 20 October, he was directly involved in half of PSV's goals in their 6–0 victory over FC Emmen, contributing two assists and one goal. Four days later, he scored his first goal in the Champions League group stage as PSV drew 2–2 with Tottenham Hotspur, also managing to send Hugo Lloris off with a red card due to an outside-of-the-box infraction. On 24 November, Lozano would score twice and provide an assist in PSV's 3–0 victory over SC Heerenveen. Lozano scored in PSV's 1–1 draw with Inter Milan in the final group stage match of the Champions League on 11 December. He was subsequently named in the Champions League breakthrough team of 2018.

On 25 April 2019, during a match against Willem II, Lozano was stretchered off the field after a challenge from Freek Heerkens. It was initially thought that the player may have suffered cruciate ligament damage and was facing a lengthy spell on the sidelines, however that was eventually ruled out. The club later released a statement stating Lozano would miss the remainder of the season.

Napoli

2019–20 season

On 23 August 2019, Lozano officially joined Italian club Napoli. He reportedly signed a five-year contract with a transfer fee of US$46.5 million (€42 million), making Lozano Napoli's most expensive signing at the time, as well as the highest transfer fee paid for a Mexican player, and the largest fee received by PSV Eindhoven for a player. Eight days later, Lozano made his Serie A debut as a second-half substitute against Juventus in Turin, scoring his side's second goal in a 4–3 defeat.

Following Carlo Ancelotti's sacking for mediocre results, Gennaro Gattuso was named as the new manager, with Lozano initially receiving little to no playing time. On 16 June 2020, he was asked to leave training by Gattuso, accusing him for lack of effort. Two days later, he appeared as an unused substitute in Napoli's Coppa Italia victory against Juventus, defeating them 4–2 in a penalty shoot-out following a scoreless draw, becoming the first Mexican to win a title with an Italian club. During the final fixtures of his first season with Napoli, Lozano received more playing time, finishing with 26 league matches and netting 4 goals.

2020–21 season
Napoli faced Parma in their opening league match of the 2020–21 season, where Lozano was in the starting line-up in the 2–0 win. The following week against Genoa saw Lozano score his first brace with the club in a 6–0 victory. The following month, he scored his second brace against Atalanta in a 4–1 victory. On 26 November, he scored his first Europa League goal in a group stage match against Croatian side Rijeka, sealing a 2–0 home victory. Following a 2–1 win over Sampdoria, in which he scored and contributed an assist, sports newspaper La Gazzetta dello Sport praised Lozano's performance, highlighting his improved form compared to that of his first season with Napoli.

On 24 January 2021, he scored his team's only goal in a 3–1 away defeat to Hellas Verona, which was clocked at 8.95 seconds from the start of the match, making it the third-fastest goal in the Serie A, the club's fastest goal, and Lozano's personal fastest. Four days later, in the Coppa Italia quarter-final match against Spezia, he scored his 100th goal across all competitions. He finished his second season with 32 league matches, notching 11 goals as the club's second highest scorer.

2021–22 season
Lozano scored his first goal of the season on 20 September, the fourth in a 4–0 victory over Udinese at the Stadio Friuli. It was his 60th goal in Europe, surpassing Nery Castillo as the fifth-highest scoring Mexican in Europe. On 9 December, during Napoli's final Europa League group stage match against Leicester City, Lozano suffered a head injury after colliding with Wilfred Ndidi's knee in the 40th minute, being stretchered off the field. He returned to action four days later as a starter in the 1–0 defeat to A.C. Milan. On 6 January 2022, Napoli announced that Lozano had tested positive for COVID-19.

On 13 January, fully recovered from COVID-19, Lozano made his return as a 63rd-minute substitute in the Coppa Italia round of 16 match against Fiorentina, only to be sent off after twenty minutes following a late challenge on Nicolás González. Four days later, he scored his first brace of the season in Napoli's 2–0 league win over Bologna.

International career

Youth
In December 2014, Lozano was called up by Sergio Almaguer to participate with the under-20 side in the CONCACAF U-20 Championship. In the first group stage match against Cuba, he scored a brace and added four assists in Mexico's 9–1 win, placing them first in their group. He went on to score three more goals and notched another assist in the tournament. Mexico went on to win the tournament, defeating Panama in a penalty shoot-out 4–2 following a 1–1 draw thus earning entry to the 2015 FIFA U-20 World Cup in New Zealand. Finishing with five goals, he was proclaimed the Golden Boot winner along with United States midfielder Romain Gall; Lozano was also named in the tournament's Best XI.

In May 2015, Lozano was then called up to participate in the U-20 World Cup, where he would appear in all three group stage matches. Mexico would finish last in the group.

On 18 September 2015, Lozano was selected by coach Raúl Gutiérrez to play in the CONCACAF Olympic Qualifying Championship. He scored Mexico's second goal in the 2–0 semi-final win over Canada.
Mexico ultimately won the tournament after defeating Honduras 2–0 in the final, with Lozano being awarded the tournament's Golden Ball as well as being included in the tournament's Best XI.

On 7 July 2016, Lozano was named in the 18-man squad that would participate in that year's Summer Olympics in Rio de Janeiro, Brazil. In Mexico's third group stage match against South Korea on 10 August, Lozano was sent off in stoppage time after shoving a Korean player. Mexico lost the match 1–0, finishing third in their group and were thus eliminated from the competition.

Senior

Lozano was included in the provisional roster for the 2015 CONCACAF Gold Cup by Miguel Herrera but was cut from the final list, remaining in the Provisional List if someone else got injured. Lozano received his first call-up to the senior national team in February 2016 under coach Juan Carlos Osorio. On 10 February, Lozano earned his first cap as a starter in the friendly against Senegal, assisting fellow Pachuca teammate Rodolfo Pizarro in the second goal as Mexico won the match 2–0. The following month, Lozano scored his first international goal in the 39th minute of the 2018 FIFA World Cup qualifying third round match against Canada, which Mexico won 3–0. He was included in Mexico's 23-man squad to participate at the Copa América Centenario. He appeared in all matches of the tournament, culminating in a quarter-final exit.

On 8 June 2017, Lozano was named in Mexico's 23-man squad for the FIFA Confederations Cup in Russia. In their final group stage match against the hosts, Lozano scored the second goal in a 2–1 win after chasing a long clearance from Héctor Herrera and beating goalkeeper Igor Akinfeev to the ball towards the edge of the box, allowing Lozano to nip in and head it into the open net. His performance led him to be named man of the match.

On 1 September 2017, Lozano scored the only goal in the 2018 FIFA World Cup qualifying match against Panama, thus booking Mexico's qualification to the tournament. On 10 November, he scored his first brace with the national team in a 3–3 draw against Belgium, scoring off a lobbed ball from Héctor Herrera on the 56th minute and scoring off a volley following a rebound from his first shot off of goalkeeper Thibaut Courtois two minutes later.

On 4 June 2018, Lozano was named in Mexico's 23-man squad for the World Cup. On 17 June, he scored the lone goal, thanks to an assist by Javier Hernández, in the opening group match win over defending champions Germany, where he was subsequently named FIFA's Man of the Match. In Mexico's second match against South Korea, Lozano provided the assist to Javier Hernández in scoring the second goal in their 2–1 win. Lozano also started in the final group fixture against Sweden, and in the round-of-16 match against Brazil.

Lozano was included in coach Gerardo Martino's preliminary squad for the 2019 CONCACAF Gold Cup, however he was subsequently ruled out of the tournament after having not fully recovered from a knee injury suffered while playing with PSV.

On 10 July 2021, Lozano suffered an injury to the head when he crashed into Trinidad and Tobago goalkeeper, Marvin Phillip who kneed Lozano on the head which also caused Lozano to have an eye gash and a neck injury and had to wear a cervical collar on the way to the hospital. It was confirmed that Lozano would miss out the rest of the 2021 Gold Cup and would miss out around 4–6 weeks.

On 14 November 2022, Lozano was named in Mexico's 26-man squad for the World Cup.

Player profile

Style of play

Mainly right-footed, Lozano is generally deployed on the left wing, but can also play on the right or as a central striker. A versatile and creative player, with good technique and an eye for goal, Lozano's shooting and crossing abilities have produced good returns of goals and assists for club and country. Lozano's style of play has been described as: "Playing on the left side of a 4–2–3–1 the vast majority of the time, right-footed Lozano has all the attributes of a classic inverted winger. Possessing great power in his right foot, he's often dangerous when shooting after cutting in from the left-hand side. [...] [He] is equally adept at creating chances as well as scoring them, with a strong left-foot he's able to deliver crosses after taking the ball down the line, although he elects to cut inside more often than choosing to go outside the opposition full-back. Lozano also has quite good creative vision, particularly for a 20 year-old." He has also been described as being "[q]uick with or without the ball and possessing a powerful and accurate shot." Although more widely known for his offensive prowess, he also offers a high defensive work rate through his speed and constant pressing on the ball when not in possession, willing to chase down loose balls and often forcing defenders and goalkeepers to clear the ball long, thus allowing his team to win the ball back quickly, or even managing to steal the ball himself. As a result, Lozano was PSV's highest-pressing player during his stay at the Dutch club. His diminutive stature and agile playing style has been cited as the reason for being the victim of various fouls, at one point becoming the most-fouled-on player in various seasons of the Liga MX.

Lozano has been criticized for a lack of discipline: railing against authority during his time with Pachuca, being involved in on-field incidents with little provocation, and picking up eight red cards despite at a young age: five with Pachuca, one with the Mexico U-23 team, and two red cards in his first season at PSV (tied with 2 other players for the most in the 2017–18 season).

He has been compared to Uruguayan striker Luis Suárez, in both playing style and personality. Lozano has cited Rafael Márquez and Damián Álvarez as players he grew up idolizing.

Reception
Early in his career, Lozano was considered to be one of the best young players in the world. In 2015, he was named by Don Balón as one of the best players in the world born after 1994. Upon his arrival to PSV Eindhoven, he was named among the top Eredivisie young players to watch for the 2017–18 season. FIFA named Lozano in their list of young stars of 2017. Multiple sources considered him a breakout star of the 2018 FIFA World Cup. He was listed on Goal.com's 2018 Goal 50 list of the fifty best players in the world. He was also included in The Guardians 2018 list of The 100 best footballers in the world. FourFourTwo included Lozano in their 2018 list of the 100 Best Football Players in the World.

Personal life
Lozano has a younger brother named Bryan Mauricio who is also a footballer, playing as a midfielder for Club Universidad Nacional.

Lozano married his girlfriend Ana Obregón in 2014, whom he met while playing for Pachuca. The pair have two children; a daughter born in 2014, and a son born in 2017.

Nickname
Lozano is popularly known by his nick name Chucky, after the doll of the Child's Play horror film series. He reportedly got the moniker during his youth career, as he used to hide under team-mates' beds and scare them.

Career statistics
Club

International

International goals
Scores and results list Mexico's goal tally first.

HonoursPachucaLiga MX: Clausura 2016
CONCACAF Champions League: 2016–17PSVEredivisie: 2017–18NapoliCoppa Italia: 2019–20Mexico YouthCONCACAF U-20 Championship: 2015
CONCACAF Olympic Qualifying Championship: 2015Individual'
CONCACAF U-20 Championship Golden Boot (Shared): 2015
CONCACAF U-20 Championship Best XI: 2015
CONCACAF Olympic Qualifying Championship Golden Ball: 2015
CONCACAF Olympic Qualifying Championship Best XI: 2015
Liga MX Best XI: Clausura 2016, Apertura 2016
Liga MX Balón de Oro Best Attacking Midfielder: 2015–16
CONCACAF Champions League Golden Boot: 2016–17
CONCACAF Champions League Best Young Player: 2016–17
Eredivisie Player of the Month: August 2017
Eredivisie Team of the Year: 2017–18
Eredivisie Team of the Month: September 2018
UEFA Champions League Breakthrough Team: 2018
CONCACAF Men's Player of the Year: 2018
CONCACAF Best XI: 2016, 2017, 2018, 2021
IFFHS CONCACAF Best XI: 2020
IFFHS CONCACAF Men's Team of the Decade: 2011–2020

References

External links
Profile at the S.S.C. Napoli website
 
 
 
 
 

1995 births
Living people
Footballers from Mexico City
Mexican footballers
Association football wingers
C.F. Pachuca players
PSV Eindhoven players
S.S.C. Napoli players
Liga Premier de México players
Liga MX players
Eredivisie players
Serie A players
Mexico under-20 international footballers
Olympic footballers of Mexico
Mexico international footballers
2015 CONCACAF U-20 Championship players
Copa América Centenario players
Footballers at the 2016 Summer Olympics
2017 FIFA Confederations Cup players
2018 FIFA World Cup players
2021 CONCACAF Gold Cup players
Mexican expatriate footballers
Expatriate footballers in the Netherlands
Expatriate footballers in Italy
Mexican expatriate sportspeople in the Netherlands
Mexican expatriate sportspeople in Italy
2022 FIFA World Cup players